Acatlán de Osorio is a city in the Mexican state of  Puebla. The shortened name Acatlán, is commonly used to refer to the municipality of which it is the seat, and to the city itself. It is at an elevation of 1,213 m (3,981 ft). In the 2000 census the population of the city was 34,765.

The name "Acatlán" comes from a combination of two Nahuatl words: acatl, for "cane" or "reed", and tlan, for "together" or "close". The name Osorio was in honor of Don Joaquín Osorio.  The Mixtecs who ruled this area prior to the Spanish incursion called it Yucuyuxi.  Acatlán was the capital of a state that was tributary to the Aztec Empire.

The modern city of Acatlán was founded on January 6, 1712, and built on the ruins of a town destroyed by an earthquake in 1711. It attained city status on April 3, 1883.

Notes

Sources
Sánchez Rubio, Miguel Ángel. La Mejor Pagina Web de ciudad de Acatlan (Archived October 24, 2009) (Retrieved September 19, 2006).

Populated places in Puebla
Populated places established in 1712